Irving Ben Cooper (February 7, 1902 – September 17, 1996) was an American attorney and jurist who served as a United States district judge of the United States District Court for the Southern District of New York.

Early life and education

Born on February 7, 1902, in London, England, Cooper received a Bachelor of Laws in 1925 from the Washington University School of Law.

Career 
Cooper worked in private practice in New York City, New York, from 1927 to 1938. He served as special counsel for the New York City Department of Investigation from 1934 to 1937. He was a magistrate for New York City from 1938 to 1939. He was a justice of the New York Court of Special Sessions from 1939 to 1960, serving as chief justice from 1951 to 1960. He was a lecturer at the Menninger Foundation from 1960 to 1961.

Cooper received a recess appointment from President John F. Kennedy on October 5, 1961, to the United States District Court for the Southern District of New York, to a new seat authorized by 75 Stat. 80. He was nominated to the same position by President Kennedy on January 15, 1962. He was confirmed by the United States Senate on September 20, 1962, and received his commission on September 28, 1962. He assumed senior status on February 7, 1972. His service terminated on September 17, 1996, due to his death in New York City.

Notable cases and judicial philosophy

In 1970, Cooper presided over a claim that organized baseball exerted a monopolistic hold on all major and minor league teams, and in 1982, a complaint filed by Jacqueline Onassis that a photographer was harassing her and her daughter, Caroline Kennedy. During his service as chief justice of the New York Court of Special Sessions, Cooper wrote yearly reports on the problems regarding the treatment of young offenders in the criminal justice system, asserting "It is not impossible for a sentence to be a greater injustice than the criminal act: equivalent to putting a child with a common cold into a smallpox ward for treatment."

See also
 List of Jewish American jurists

References

External links

 Elanor Roosevelt's letter about Judge Cooper's 1953 Report on 'Youthful Offenders'
 Photographer Cited for Contempt in annoying Jacqueline Onassis
 The Courts and Baseball
 'The Case of the Albuquerque Eights' Is Closed; Or White-Collar Crime Is Easy
 Time article from 1962
 

British emigrants to the United States
Judges of the United States District Court for the Southern District of New York
United States district court judges appointed by John F. Kennedy
20th-century American judges
Washington University School of Law alumni
1902 births
1996 deaths
20th-century American lawyers
Washington University in St. Louis alumni